Carl Niklas Lindqvist (born 16 May 1964 in Stockholm) is a Swedish former alpine skier who competed in the 1988 Winter Olympics.

References

External links
 

1964 births
Swedish male alpine skiers
Alpine skiers at the 1988 Winter Olympics
Olympic alpine skiers of Sweden
Sportspeople from Stockholm
Living people
20th-century Swedish people